Bob Guelker (June 26, 1923 – February 22, 1986) was an American soccer coach and administrator.  He coached 24 years at the collegiate level, including coaching St. Louis University to five championships (1959, 1960, 1962, 1963, 1965). He coached the U.S. teams at both the 1971 Pan American Games and the 1972 Summer Olympics.  He was president of the United States Soccer Football Association from 1967 to 1969 and is a member of the National Soccer Hall of Fame.

Coach
After graduating from St. Louis University (SLU), Guelker coached soccer at St. Louis Preparatory Seminary.  In 1958, he approached SLU regarding establishing a men's soccer team.  The university agreed and Guelker, working on a shoestring budget of $200 played five club (4–1 record) games that season.  In 1959, the school took the sport to the intercollegiate level.  The move paid off as the Billikens won the inaugural NCAA Division I championship.  Guelker continued to coach St. Louis through the 1966 season, taking the team to a 95–10–5 record and winning five championships (1959, 1960, 1962, 1963, 1965).  The Billikens also finished as runners-up in 1961.  He was inducted into the St. Louis University Hall of Fame in 1979. On September 30, 2009, Guelker was named to SLU's Half-Century Team.

In 1966, Guelker left SLU and moved to Southern Illinois University Edwardsville (SIUE) to establish the soccer program and serve as the Cougars' athletic director.  In 1972, when the NCAA established Division II soccer, Guelker's team won the first NCAA Division II championship.  In 1973, he was selected as the NSCAA Coach of the Year.  After winning the Division II title, SIUE moved into Division I competition, and Guelker won one last title when the Cougars took the 1979 title 3–2 over the Clemson Tigers.   Guelker's role as SIUE's head coach ended with his death in February 1986, after having compiled a 216–67–21 record with SIUE.  In 2005, SIUE inducted Guelker into the school's Athletics Hall of Fame.

As a college coach, Guelker achieved a record of 311–77–26 and won seven NCAA titles, including the first in both Division I and Division II. In 1971, Guelker coached the U.S. soccer team at the Pan American Games, and a year later, he coached the U.S. at the 1972 Summer Olympics.  He also coached the U.S. Under 19 national team.

Executive
In addition to coaching, Guelker held various executive positions at the local and national levels. In 1946, he became the Executive Secretary for the Catholic Youth Council, Archdiocese of St. Louis, a position he held until 1969. .  He was the president of the United States Soccer Football Association from 1967 to 1969. He was also the Chair of the National Junior Cup Competition Committee, USSF Olympic Development Committee, Missouri Soccer Federation, and Missouri Senior Soccer Association.

The Catholic Youth Council of St. Louis holds an annual “Bob Guelker Soccer Tournament” in his honor.  He was inducted into the National Soccer Hall of Fame in 1980 and the St. Louis Soccer Hall of Fame in 1986 and the National Soccer Coaches Association of America's Hall of Fame in 1993.

Coaching record

References

External links
National Soccer Hall of Fame

1923 births
1986 deaths
Sportspeople from St. Louis
American soccer coaches
SIU Edwardsville Cougars men's soccer coaches
Saint Louis Billikens men's soccer coaches
National Soccer Hall of Fame members
Presidents of the United States Soccer Federation
American Olympic coaches